Sam Sparro, the Australian-born pop, dance, house, and soul singer-songwriter, record producer, and remix engineer, has released three studio albums. His eponymous debut album, Sam Sparro, released through both Modus Vivendi and Island Records, has been certified Gold. His second album, Return to Paradise was released with EMI. He has released two mixtapes. On 5 August 2013 Sparro released the mixtape Mechanical. to his SoundCloud account to promote his upcoming extended play, Quantum Physical, Vol. 1. Love Made Me Do It was released via his SoundCloud account on 13 February 2015. Sparro has released five extended plays. His first extended play Black + Gold was released by Modus Vivendi Music in January 2007. London Festival '08 was first released on 1 January 2008 with Island Records. Sparro released his third extended play, Pink Cloud, as a free download to promote his then upcoming second album before a number of release push-backs. He released Quantum Physical, Vol. 1 independently on 1 October 2014. On 16 October 2015 Sparro released the second volume of Quantum Physical with Intuit Records.

As a lead artist, Sparro has released ten singles and five Promotional Singles. His most successful single, "Black and Gold", garnered him a Grammy nomination for Best Dance Recording in 2009. The single "Happiness" was certified Platinum in Belgium. The single "21st Century Life" also experienced some commercial success following the release of "Black and Gold" in 2008, and in Belgium his song "Yellow Orange Rays" charted following the release of "Happiness". The single "Pocket" also charted in Australia. Sparro has also been featured on four singles, including songs by Beni, Mason (with DMC), and Plastic Plates; the most notable being "Feelings Gone" from Basement Jaxx's fifth studio album, Scars. On 13 August 2013 he released the single "Hang on 2 Your Love" with Durand Bernarr from his extended play Quantum Physical, Vol. 1. On 31 July 2015 he released the single "Hands Up" from his extended play Quantum Physical, Vol. 2, with a remix single following on 25 September.

Sparro has also made numerous other album appearances through featured vocal performances, remix engineering, songwriting, and production. Sparro has written 3 songs with Adam Lambert that have appeared on Lambert's albums, For Your Entertainment, Glam Nation Live, and Trespassing, and two songs with Courtney Act which appeared on his extended play Kaleidoscope. He has remixed songs for Kimbra, OK Go, Livvi Franc, Sky Ferreira, Miami Horror, Penguin Prison, Lolene, Saint Motel, O'Spada, and Love Grenades. Cameo Lover, the song Sparro remixed for Kimbra, has been featured as a bonus track on her Platinum selling debut album, Vows.

Albums

Studio albums

Mixtapes

Extended plays

Singles

As lead artist

As a featured artist

Promotional singles

Other appearances
The following have been officially released, but are not featured on a main release by Sparro.

Special releases

Remixes

Writing and production credits

Music
The following have been written and/or produced by Sparro for other artists.

Unpublished
The following are songs that have been written and/or produced by Sparro but remain unpublished.

Television and film
The following are original compositions written and/or produced by Sparro for use in television and film.

Music videos

As featured artist

Other music video appearances

References

General

Specific

External links

Discographies of Australian artists
Pop music discographies
Electronic music discographies